Carlos Alberto Vivas González (born 4 April 2002) is a Venezuelan footballer who plays as a defender for Deportivo Táchira F.C..

Career statistics

Club

Notes

References

2002 births
Living people
Venezuelan footballers
Venezuela youth international footballers
Association football defenders
Deportivo Táchira F.C. players
People from San Cristóbal, Táchira
Portland Timbers 2 players
MLS Next Pro players